John A. Terry (May 6, 1933 – September 5, 2021) was a judge of the District of Columbia Court of Appeals, the highest court for the District of Columbia.

Born in Utica, New York, Terry was raised in St. Louis, Missouri, and attended John Burroughs School.  He graduated magna cum laude from Yale University in 1954 before enrolling at Georgetown University Law Center in 1957. In 1962, he joined the United States Attorney's Office for the District of Columbia. Beginning in 1969, he served as chief of the appellate division for 13 years until he was appointed to the District of Columbia Court of Appeals in 1982. He took senior status in 2006. Terry died in September 2021.

References

Sources 
 
 Interview with Hon. John A. Terry, Oral History Project, Historical Society of the District of Columbia Circuit
 

1933 births
2021 deaths
20th-century American judges
21st-century American judges
Assistant United States Attorneys
Georgetown University Law Center alumni
Judges of the District of Columbia Court of Appeals
Lawyers from Washington, D.C.
Yale College alumni